Ash Sharqiyah North Governorate (English: Northeastern Governorate) is a governorate of Oman. It was created on 28 October 2011, when Ash Sharqiyah Region was split into Ash Sharqiyah North Governorate and Ash Sharqiyah South Governorate. The centre of the governorate is the wilāyah (province) of Ibra.

Provinces
Ash-Sharqiyah North Governorate consists of six wilāyāt:
 Al-Qabil, population (2017): 23,824
 Al-Mudhaibi, population (2017): 117,691
 Bidiya, population (2017): 40,812
 Dema Wa Thaieen, population (2017): 26,817
 Ibra, population (2017): 57,561
 Wadi Bani Khalid, population (2017): 12,518

Demographics

See also
 Eastern Arabia
 Sharqiya Sands

References

 
Governorates of Oman